Nausinoe gueyraudi is a moth of the family Crambidae. It is endemic to La Réunion.

References

Moths described in 2003
Spilomelinae
Moths of Réunion
Endemic fauna of Réunion